Borgo d'Ale is a comune (municipality) in the Province of Vercelli in the Italian region Piedmont, located about  northeast of Turin and about  west of Vercelli.

Borgo d'Ale borders the following municipalities: Alice Castello, Azeglio, Bianzè, Borgomasino, Cossano Canavese, Maglione, Moncrivello, Settimo Rottaro, Tronzano Vercellese, and Viverone.

Demographic evolution

References

Cities and towns in Piedmont